Big Falls is the name of some places in the U.S. state of Wisconsin:

Big Falls, Rusk County, Wisconsin, a town
Big Falls, Waupaca County, Wisconsin, a village

nl:Big Falls (Wisconsin)
pt:Big Falls (Wisconsin)